Inside In / Inside Out is the debut studio album by British indie rock band The Kooks. It was released on 23 January 2006 on Virgin Records. It contains the singles, "Eddie's Gun", "Sofa Song", "You Don't Love Me", "Naïve", "She Moves in Her Own Way", and "Ooh La". The album was produced by Tony Hoffer of record label Virgin Records. Reaching No. 2 in the UK Albums Chart, the album has sold over 2,000,000 copies worldwide since its release.

Background
After they had signed to Virgin Records, The Kooks were reluctant to record an album straight away, stating a desire to focus more on their live performances and songwriting. The band has said embarking on their first live tour instead of recording an album initially helped them develop their style and sound. As lead singer Luke Pritchard claimed, "We didn't sit down with a blueprint. We just naturally developed and we didn't try to shape or mould ourselves to anything." As a result, they went into the studio with hundreds of songs from a variety of genres, and it took an "incredible amount of patience" from producer Tony Hoffer to shape the content into what would become the record. Most of the album is written about Katie Melua, whom Pritchard dated while at the BRIT School.

Following their first tour supporting The Thrills, The Kooks recorded their debut album, Inside In/Inside Out, at Konk studios in London in 2005.

Chart performance
Though media attention was dominated by the release of the Arctic Monkeys debut album Whatever People Say I Am, That's What I'm Not on the same day, Inside In/Inside Out recorded first week sales of 19,098 and entered the UK Albums Chart at number nine. It would eventually peak at number two for two weeks. It has since been certified 5× Platinum by the British Phonographic Industry (BPI) for sales of over 1,500,000.

In a later interview with NME, Pritchard thanked the Arctic Monkeys for "shielding" The Kooks from the press' scrutiny: God bless the Arctic Monkeys because if it wasn't for them we wouldn't have been so shielded. We were so overshadowed by the success [of] it (their album) because it was so monster and we crept in behind everybody's back.

15th anniversary tour and reissue
To mark the 15th anniversary of Inside In/Inside Out, on 21 May 2021 The Kooks announced a January–February 2022 tour of the U.K. and Ireland in which the band's current line-up would perform the album in full. After the initial announcement, the band added more dates to the tour. Following the U.K. and Ireland dates, the band announced they were bringing the Inside In/Inside Out 15th anniversary shows to Australia in October 2022.

In addition to the tour, on 27 August 2021 The Kooks released a 15th Anniversary deluxe edition reissue of Inside In/Inside Out. Besides the album being remastered, it also included a bonus disc of alternate takes and demos, plus a booklet of liner notes containing interviews with all four original members of the band.

Track listing 

 Acoustic edition
Also available is Inside In / Inside Out Acoustic, an acoustic version of the album recorded at live performances at Abbey Road Studios, London and Osaka, Japan using acoustic guitars. The CD contains all of the songs from Inside In/Inside Out except "I Want You", "If Only", and "Got No Love". One song not on the original album, "California", is contained on this version, recorded live in Osaka. The edition is available as a CD from Virgin Records. The acoustic edition was also released as a bonus vinyl LP with the standard LP.

Personnel
Luke Pritchard – lead vocals, rhythm guitar
Hugh Harris – lead guitar, backing vocals
Max Rafferty – bass, backing vocals
Paul Garred – drums

Legacy
Kris Leonard of Viola Beach told Wonderland in January 2016 that Inside In/Inside Out was the first album he bought, at the age of nine. He credited the record with inspiring him to become a musician.

Charts and certifications

Weekly charts

Year-end charts

Decade-end charts

Certifications

References

External links 
 

2006 debut albums
The Kooks albums
Virgin Records albums
Albums produced by Tony Hoffer